Éamonn O'Donoghue (born 1946 in Ballylongford, County Kerry) is an Irish former sportsperson. He played Gaelic football with his local club Ballylongford and was a member of the Kerry senior inter-county team in the 1960s and 1970s.

References

1946 births
Living people
Ballylongford Gaelic footballers
Kerry inter-county Gaelic footballers
Munster inter-provincial Gaelic footballers